OASYS may refer to:

Brands and enterprises
 OASys (company), a 100% subsidiary of Webasto
Accuvue Oasys, a brand of contact lenses

Computing and technology
 Korg OASYS, a workstation synthesizer released in early 2005
 Omgeo OASYS, US financial markets trade confirmation service
 OASys, an acronym for the Offender Assessment System, an IT system used by HM Prisons and the National Probation Service in England and Wales

See also
Oasis (disambiguation)